Batrachomatus is a genus of beetles in the family Dytiscidae, containing the following species:

 Batrachomatus daemeli (Sharp, 1882)
 Batrachomatus larsoni Hendrich & Balke, 2013
 Batrachomatus nannup (Watts, 1978)
 Batrachomatus wilsoni (Mouchamps, 1964)
 Batrachomatus wingii Clark, 1863

References

Dytiscidae genera